Darreh Naru (also Romanized as Darreh Nārū; also known as Darreh-ye Anārān, Darreh Anārān, and Dar-i-Anār) is a village in Sepiddasht Rural District, Papi District, Khorramabad County, Lorestan Province, Iran. At the 2006 census, its population was 56, in 12 families.

References 

Towns and villages in Khorramabad County